The Monk from Santarem (German: Der Mönch von Santarem) is a 1924 German silent film, an adaption of the play of the same name by Almeida Garrett.  It was directed by Lothar Mendes and stars Evi Eva, Walter Rilla and Vivian Gibson.

The film's sets were designed by the art director Ernst Stern.

Cast
 Alf Blütecher 
 Emmy Förster 
 Vivian Gibson 
 Tzwetta Tzatschewa 
 Evi Eva 
 Alice de Finetti 
 Walter Rilla 
 Magnus Stifter
 Marlene Dietrich

References

Bibliography
 Hans-Michael Bock and Tim Bergfelder. The Concise Cinegraph: An Encyclopedia of German Cinema. Berghahn Books.

External links

1924 films
Films of the Weimar Republic
Films directed by Lothar Mendes
German silent feature films
German black-and-white films